"Like Wow!" is the debut single by American recording artist Leslie Carter. Her debut album of the same name was shelved, making the single her only official release.

The song was officially released on January 13, 2001, and appears on the Shrek soundtrack. It is also played in the film's end credits. The song was later featured in the GameCube game Donkey Konga.

Track listing
US Promo CD
 "Like Wow!" (Radio Edit)

US CD single
 "Like Wow!" (Radio Edit)
 "True"

Australia CD single
 "Like Wow!"
 "Shy Guy"
 "Too Much Too Soon"
 "I Wanna Be Your Girl"

Release history

Music video
The music video was rarely seen, although it was shown on both the Disney Channel and Nickelodeon, and was not featured on any release. It shows Carter and her boyfriend throughout the video, in an animated scene with bright colors. It was directed by Gregory Dark.

In November 2006, according to Stylus, Carter never wanted to record her first album, but was pressured by her mother. Stylus reports that the video cost $350,000 to make.

Chart performance

Year-end charts

Footnotes

2000 songs
2001 debut singles
Leslie Carter songs
Songs written by Jimmy Harry
Music videos directed by Gregory Dark
DreamWorks Records singles